Elgin Bridge may refer to:

 Elgin Bridge (Singapore)
 Elgin Bridge (Barabanki), in India